Japanese North Korean or North Korean Japanese may refer to:
Japanese people in North Korea
North Koreans in Japan
Japan–North Korea relations
Japanese language education in North Korea

See also
Chongryon, the North Korean-funded ethnic representative organisation for Koreans in Japan
Zainichi Korean language, the dialect of Korean spoken in Japan